Suicide Squad is a 2016 American superhero film written and directed by David Ayer. The film stars Will Smith, Jared Leto, Margot Robbie, Joel Kinnaman, Viola Davis, Jai Courtney, Jay Hernandez, Adewale Akinnuoye-Agbaje, Ike Barinholtz, Scott Eastwood and Cara Delevingne. In the film, a secret government agency led by Amanda Waller recruits imprisoned supervillains to execute dangerous black ops missions and save the world from a powerful threat, in exchange for leaner sentences.

Suicide Squad, produced on a budget of $175 million, was released theatrically in the United States on August 5, 2016, following a strong debut that set new box office records, the film grossed over $745 million worldwide, making it the 10th highest-grossing film of 2016. It received generally negative reviews from critics, who criticized the plot, directing and characters,  though Robbie's performance received praise. The film has garnered numerous awards and nominations with most nominations recognising the film itself and the performances of the cast.

Suicide Squad was nominated for three Grammy Awards as well as one Critics' Choice Movie Awards (winning one), seven People's Choice Awards (winning one) and received multiple Teen Choice Awards nominations, including "Choice AnTEENcipated Movie", "Choice Movie Actor: AnTEENcipated" for Will Smith and Scott Eastwood, and "Choice Movie Actress: AnTEENcipated" for Margot Robbie and Cara Delevingne. It won in both the former and latter categories. The film won an Academy Award for Best Makeup and Hairstyling at 89th Academy Awards, making it the first film in the DC Extended Universe to win an Academy Award.

Accolades

References

External links
 

Suicide Squad
Suicide Squad (film series)